BHC Communications, Inc. was the holding company for the broadcast property of Chris-Craft Industries. BHC stands for "broadcasting holding company".

History 
The firm was originally incorporated in 1977 as BHC, Incorporated by Chris-Craft Industries to hold its two existing incorporated independent television stations, KCOP Television (KCOP in Los Angeles) and Oregon Television (KPTV in Portland, Oregon), within BHC's Chris-Craft Television subsidiary. That same year, Chris-Craft purchased a share of 20th Century Fox. In 1981, the 20th Century Fox share, then at 20 percent, was traded for 19% of United Television. United owned three other television stations: independent KMSP-TV in Minneapolis, ABC affiliate KTVX in Salt Lake City, and NBC-affiliated KMOL-TV (now WOAI-TV) in San Antonio.

Warner Communications, Inc. purchased a 42.5 percent share in BHC for $200 million in convertible preferred stock. With the Time, Inc./Warner Communications, Inc. merger into Time-Warner, Inc., BHC got a return of some stock held by Warner, cash, and Time Warner convertible preferred stock in Time Warner, a total of valued at $2.3 billion over a six-year period. With this settlement, BHC was reincorporated as BHC Communications, Inc. with stock restructured with two classes of stock giving Chris-Craft most of the voting power. Some BHC's shares were distributed to other Warner stockholders made it a publicly traded corporation. Some the payment were used to buy back BHC class A shares. WWOR-TV, an independent station (and national superstation) in the New York City area, was purchased in 1992 for $313 million. In 1995, United Sales Enterprises was formed to hand national spot advertising time for all BHC/United stations.

Chris-Craft TV teamed up with MCA Television for a syndicated programming block, Hollywood Premiere Network, for only the 1990–1991 season. In the early 1990s, BHC Television formed an alternative programming consortium, Prime Time Entertainment Network, with other station groups and Time Warner-owned Warner Bros. Domestic Television that was planned to expand into the fifth television network.

In January 1995, BHC affiliated all of its stations, except the Salt Lake City and San Antonio outlets, with the newly launched United Paramount Network, which it fully owned and financed but ran with Paramount/Viacom, the network's producer. In December 1996, Paramount exercised its option to buy half of the Network by paying half of the losses ($160 million). Included in the deal was to continue selling UPN "Star Trek: Voyager" instead of placing it in syndication.

In the late 1990s, BHC acquired two television stations, WHSW (now WUTB) in Baltimore, Maryland, and WRBW in Orlando, Florida, it resulted in the increase of BHC's number of television stations to ten.

In 1999, Viacom announced plans to merge with CBS Corporation. Because of a regulation upheld by the FCC years ago, prohibiting companies from owning two broadcast networks. Viacom's announcement raised questions regarding the future of Chris-Craft and Viacom's joint ownership of UPN. In Viacom and Chris-Craft's original agreement, two options for exiting the partnership had been determined—buying out the other partner or paying for what the partner had invested up to that date and providing funds for the future operation of UPN. Either option would cost Viacom substantial sums of money. Industry analysts agreed that Chris-Craft could emerge the winner and offered other possible scenarios—that Viacom might offer Chris-Craft some of its stations in exchange for severing the partnership or that Chris-Craft might sell Viacom's share to another company.

In 2000, a lawsuit was filed by BHC against the Viacom-CBS merger as BHC saw this as a breach of the UPN partnership. BHC lost the suit and sold its remaining ownership in UPN to Viacom for $5 million. Shortly thereafter, Chris-Craft announced that it was getting out of broadcasting after losing $500 million on UPN, the possibility of UPN shutting down or having their affiliation pulled. Many industry observers thought Viacom would end up getting the stations, but Viacom's bid lost out to News Corporation's Fox Television Stations, resulting in a sale which closed on July 31, 2001.

Former television stations 

Footnotes:
 1 KCOP-TV and KPTV were owned directly by Chris-Craft prior to the formation of BHC in 1977.
 2 KUTP is the only station built and signed-on by Chris-Craft/United.
 3 KMSP-TV, KTVX, and KMOL-TV were owned by United Television prior to its merger with Chris-Craft in 1981.
 4 KTVX is the only station that never affiliated with UPN in the timeframe Chris-Craft owned stations in the mid-to-late 1990s.
 5 KMOL-TV, a primary NBC affiliate, had a secondary affiliation to UPN in 1998–2000 when another station dropped it.
 6 WWOR-TV is MNTV's flagship station, and was UPN's flagship station prior to Chris-Craft/United's acquisition by Viacom in 2001.

United Television 

United Television was a corporation operating multiple television stations founded in 1956 to run station KMSP-TV in Minneapolis. In 1975, United purchased KTVX-TV, a Salt Lake City ABC affiliate, and KMOL-TV, a San Antonio NBC affiliate. Fox purchased an interest in the company making it a subsidiary, and in 1980, briefly consider purchasing NBC affiliate WRBT in Baton Rouge prior to the interest change in 1981. In 1981, BHC/Chris-Craft traded its interest in 20th Century Fox to Marvin Davis and Marc Rich for a 19% interest in United. BHC upped its stake in United to 50.1 percent of common stock in 1983. A UHF station was acquired that same year in San Francisco. In the final quarter of 1985, United started a new UHF station in Phoenix, KUTP. Loaning its name to a network joint venture of its parent corporation BHC with Paramount Pictures, most of United stations switch programming to United Paramount Network. In January 1998, United Television acquired a third UHF station in Baltimore for $80 million, changed its call letters to WUTB, and made the station a UPN affiliate. United, in October 1997, agreed to purchase WRBW (channel 65), a UHF station and UPN affiliate in Orlando, Florida, for $60 million and possible further considerations (WRBW was later acquired by Fox Television Stations after the BHC-News Corp. merger, and is now a MyNetworkTV owned-and-operated station). In April 1998, United took a minority stake in Bohbot Entertainment & Media. 20th Century Fox later returned to interest in the broadcast industry when in 1986, it purchased 6 stations from Metromedia, which these stations became affiliated with Fox's new Fox Broadcasting Company, which was first aired in late 1986. Fox later reacquired United Television's stations as part of the acquisition of BHC by the latter in 2001.

References 

Defunct broadcasting companies of the United States
Defunct television broadcasting companies of the United States
UPN
Prime Time Entertainment Network
Holding companies established in 1977
Mass media companies disestablished in 2001

Companies formerly listed on NYSE American
Mass media companies established in 1977
2001 mergers and acquisitions